John Ambler Smith (September 23, 1847 – January 6, 1892) was a U.S. Representative from Virginia.

Early and family life
Born at Village View plantation, near Dinwiddie Court House, Virginia, to Dr. John Harvie Smith and his wife, Smith was born to the First Families of Virginia. His grandfather Larkin Smith had served in the Virginia House of Delegates representing King and Queen County and even became its Speaker. John received an education appropriate for his class, then traveled to Richmond to attend David Turner's high school while his father was a surgeon for the Confederate States Army, and ran Chimborazo Hospital in that city. Following the American Civil War, he studied law at Richmond College and graduated.

Career

Admitted to the bar in 1867, Smith began a private legal practice in Richmond, Virginia.
He was appointed commissioner in chancery of the courts of Richmond in 1868.
He served as Commonwealth attorney of Charles City and New Kent Counties.
He served as member of the State senate in 1869.

Smith was elected as a Republican to the Forty-third Congress (March 4, 1873 – March 3, 1875) with 51.11% of the vote, defeating Democrat George Douglas Wise. He was an unsuccessful candidate for renomination in 1874. He resumed the practice of law in Washington, D.C. He served as member of the immigration commission to London.

Death and legacy

He died in Washington, D.C., on January 6, 1892. He was interred in Glenwood Cemetery.

References

Bibliography

1847 births
1892 deaths
People from Dinwiddie County, Virginia
Virginia lawyers
Burials at Glenwood Cemetery (Washington, D.C.)
Republican Party members of the United States House of Representatives from Virginia
19th-century American politicians
19th-century American lawyers